Cambodia University of Specialties (CUS) is a private university based in Phnom Penh, Cambodia. The university, established in 2002, is one of the largest private universities in Cambodia.

Universities in Cambodia
Private universities and colleges